Pierre Even (born 4 December 1946 in Wiesbaden) is a Luxembourgish composer.

He is a descendant of the Even family from Beaufort, Luxembourg and Metz (France). He studied piano and composition in Wiesbaden with Karl-Wilhelm Brühl from 1959–1965, and religious music in Mainz with Diethard Hellmann from 1969-1973.

Since 1966 performances of orchestra music, chamber music and religious music, among others: Tango para los oídos (2005), Dithyrambus for Strings (1966), Concertino for viola and string orchestra, Op.11 (1970, 2004), Trio for Flute, Clarinet and Bassoon (2001), Neuf caractères pour violon et piano (2004), Sonata for Cello and Piano (2004), different works for organ (since 1966) and for choir (since 1971), two cantatas (1971/1972), Pastorale for four Trombones (2002).

References
 Wengler, Marcel: L'Histoire du Tango. Dans le cadre du 25e Anniversaire de la LGNM. Luxembourg: Luxembourg Music Information Centre, 2008. pp. 18–19.
 Even, Pierre: Nassau oblige. Musicalia aus der Grossherzoglichen Hofbibliothek Schloss Berg, gewidmet den Herrschern und Herrscherinnen der Häuser Nassau und Luxemburg. Wiesbaden: Hessische Landesbibliothek, 2008. pp. 128–129.

External links
Biography of Pierre Even at the Luxembourg Music Information Centre
pierre-even.de
avoca.de

1946 births
Living people
20th-century classical composers
20th-century male musicians
21st-century classical composers
21st-century male musicians
Luxembourgian composers
Male classical composers
People from Wiesbaden